The streamline upwind Petrov–Galerkin pressure-stabilizing Petrov–Galerkin formulation for incompressible Navier–Stokes equations can be used for finite element computations of high Reynolds number incompressible flow using equal order of finite element space (i.e. ) by introducing additional stabilization terms in the Navier–Stokes Galerkin formulation.

The finite element (FE) numerical computation of incompressible Navier–Stokes equations (NS) suffers from two main sources of numerical instabilities arising from the associated Galerkin problem. Equal order finite elements for pressure and velocity, (for example), do not satisfy the inf-sup condition and leads to instability on the discrete pressure (also called spurious pressure).
Moreover, the advection term in the Navier–Stokes equations can produce oscillations in the velocity field (also called spurious velocity). Such spurious velocity oscillations become more evident for advection-dominated (i.e., high Reynolds number ) flows. To control instabilities arising from inf-sup condition and convection dominated problem, pressure-stabilizing Petrov–Galerkin (PSPG) stabilization along with Streamline-Upwind Petrov-Galerkin (SUPG) stabilization can be added to the NS Galerkin formulation.

The incompressible Navier–Stokes equations for a Newtonian fluid

Introducing an unknown velocity field  and an unknown pressure field , in absence of body forces, the incompressible Navier–Stokes (NS) equations read

The functions  and  indicate suitable Dirichlet and Neumann data, respectively, while  is the known initial field solution at time .

For a Newtonian fluid, the Cauchy stress tensor  depends linearly on the components of the strain rate tensor:

The first of the NS equations represents the balance of the momentum and the second one the conservation of the mass, also called continuity equation (or incompressible constraint).

Hence, the strong formulation of the incompressible Navier–Stokes equations for a constant density, Newtonian and homogeneous fluid can be written as:

Find, velocity  and pressure  such that:

In the NS equations, the Reynolds number shows how important is the non linear term, compared to the dissipative term,  

The Reynolds number is a measure of the ratio between the advection convection terms, generated by inertial forces in the flow velocity, and the diffusion term specific of fluid viscous forces. Thus,  can be used to discriminate between advection-convection dominated flow and diffusion dominated one. Namely:
 for "low" , viscous forces dominate and we are in the viscous fluid situation (also named Laminar Flow),
 for "high" , inertial forces prevail and a slightly viscous fluid with high velocity emerges (also named Turbulent Flow).

The weak formulation of the Navier–Stokes equations
As a consequence:

By summing up the two equations and performing integration by parts for pressure and viscous term:

Hence,

where . The integral terms with  vanish because , while the term on  become

The weak formulation of Navier–Stokes equations reads:

Finite element Galerkin formulation of Navier–Stokes equations

In order to numerically solve the NS problem, first the discretization of the weak formulation is performed.

the discretized-in-space Galerkin problem of the weak NS equation reads:

Time discretization of discretized-in-space NS Galerkin problem can be performed, for example, by using the second order Backward Differentiation Formula (BDF2), that is an implicit second order multistep method. Divide uniformly the finite time interval  into  time step of size 

Thus, the BDF2 approximation of the time derivative reads as follows:

So, the fully discretized in time and space NS Galerkin problem is:

The main issue of a fully implicit method for the NS Galerkin formulation is that the resulting problem is still non linear, due to the convective term, . Indeed, if  is put, this choice leads to solve a non-linear system (for example, by means of the Newton or Fixed point algorithm) with a huge computational cost. In order to reduce this cost, it is possible to use a semi-implicit approach with a second order extrapolation for the velocity, in the convective term:

Finite element formulation and the INF-SUP condition
Let's define the finite element (FE) spaces of continuous functions,  (polynomials of degree  on each element  of the triangulation) as

The FE spaces  and  need to satisfy the inf-sup condition(or LBB):

However,  can still be used with additional stabilization terms such as Streamline Upwind Petrov-Galerkin with a Pressure-Stabilizing Petrov-Galerkin term (SUPG-PSPG).

In order to derive the FE algebraic formulation of the fully discretized Galerkin NS problem, it is necessary to introduce two basis for the discrete spaces  and 

in order to expand our variables as

Problem is completed by an initial condition on the velocity . Moreover, using the semi-implicit treatment , the trilinear term  becomes bilinear, and the corresponding matrix is 

Hence, the linear system can be written in a single monolithic matrix (also called monolithic NS matrix) of the form

where .

Streamline upwind Petrov–Galerkin formulation for incompressible Navier–Stokes equations

NS equations with finite element formulation suffer from two source of numerical instability, due to the fact that: 
 NS is a convection dominated problem, which means "large" , where numerical oscillations in the velocity field can occur (spurious velocity);
 FE spaces  are unstable combinations of velocity and pressure finite element spaces, that do not satisfy the inf-sup condition, and generates numerical oscillations in the pressure field (spurious pressure).

To control instabilities arising from inf-sup condition and convection dominated problem, Pressure-Stabilizing Petrov–Galerkin(PSPG) stabilization along with Streamline-Upwind Petrov–Galerkin (SUPG) stabilization can be added to the NS Galerkin formulation.

where  is a positive constant,  is a stabilization parameter,  is a generic tetrahedron belonging to the finite elements partitioned domain ,  is the residual of the NS equations.

The skew-symmetric part of a generic operator  is the one for which 

Since it is based on the residual of the NS equations, the SUPG-PSPG is a strongly consistent stabilization method.

The discretized finite element Galerkin formulation with SUPG-PSPG stabilization can be written as:

Find, for all  , such that

corresponds to the streamline diffusion term stabilization for large . The other terms occur to obtain a strongly consistent stabilization.

Regarding the choice of the stabilization parameters , and :

The parameters  and  can be obtained by a multidimensional generalization of the optimal value introduced in for the one-dimensional case.

Notice that the terms added by the SUPG-PSPG stabilization can be explicitly written as follows 

Hence, the NS monolithic system with the SUPG-PSPG stabilization becomes

It is well known that SUPG-PSPG stabilization does not exhibit excessive numerical diffusion if at least second-order velocity elements and first-order pressure elements are used.

References

Finite element method